Eli S. Faber (July 30, 1943 – April 2020) was a professor of history at John Jay College of Criminal Justice. He was the editor of the American Jewish History journal.

He studied American history from Columbia University, for which he received a Ph.D. He originally found out about the George Stinney case, in which a 14-year-old African-American boy was sentenced to death via electric chair after being accused of murdering two girls, in an academic conference in 2003. His final book, which recounted the story of this case, was published posthumously, in June 2021. 

He was married to Lani Faber and died of pancreatic cancer in April 2020, which had been diagnosed in March 2019.

Works
A Time for Planting: The First Migration, 1654–1820 (1992)
Jews, Slaves and the Slave Trade: Setting the Record Straight (1998)
The Child in the Electric Chair (2021)

References

1943 births
2020 deaths
American historians
John Jay College of Criminal Justice faculty